DeBordieu Colony, DeBordieu Beach or simply DeBordieu is a private, unincorporated community and census-designated place (CDP) in Georgetown County, South Carolina, United States. Parts of DeBordieu lie on Debidue Island. DeBordieu is located south of Pawleys Island and north of Georgetown east of U.S. Route 17. It is an oceanfront gated community with a private golf and country club.

It was first listed as a CDP in the 2020 census with a population of 858.

Demographics

2020 census

Note: the US Census treats Hispanic/Latino as an ethnic category. This table excludes Latinos from the racial categories and assigns them to a separate category. Hispanics/Latinos can be of any race.

References

External links
 Official website

Unincorporated communities in South Carolina
Unincorporated communities in Georgetown County, South Carolina
Census-designated places in South Carolina
Census-designated places in Georgetown County, South Carolina
Populated coastal places in South Carolina